Andriy Mykolaiovych Serhieiev (born March 26, 1991), also known as Andrei Sergeyev, is a Ukrainian-Russian professional ice hockey defenceman who currently plays for Lokomotiv Yaroslavl of the Kontinental Hockey League (KHL).

Following two seasons with HC Dynamo Moscow, Sergeyev left as a free agent and signed a two-year contract with Lokomotiv Yaroslavl on 1 May 2022.

References

External links

1991 births
Living people
Amur Khabarovsk players
HC CSKA Moscow players
HC Dynamo Moscow players
HC Neftekhimik Nizhnekamsk players
Russian ice hockey defencemen
Ukrainian ice hockey defencemen
HC Spartak Moscow players
Universiade medalists in ice hockey
HC Yugra players
Universiade gold medalists for Russia
Competitors at the 2011 Winter Universiade